Ursula Weber (born 26 September 1960) is an Austrian athlete. She competed in the women's discus throw at the 1992 Summer Olympics.

References

1960 births
Living people
Athletes (track and field) at the 1992 Summer Olympics
Austrian female discus throwers
Olympic athletes of Austria
Place of birth missing (living people)